Cuillin Sound is a sound (inlet) that separates the island of Skye from the islands of Rùm and Canna, all of which are located in Scotland's Inner Hebrides.

The sound gives its name to the H.M.S. Cuillin Sound, a British repair ship that was allocated to the British Pacific Fleet during World War II.

See also
Sounds of Scotland

References

Sounds of Scotland
Scottish coast
Bodies of water of Scotland
Landforms of the Isle of Skye